Anuttaraupapātikadaśāh is the ninth of the 12 Jain āgamas said to be promulgated by Māhavīra himself. Anuttaraupapātikadaśāh translated as "Ten Chapters about the arisers in the Highest Heavens" is said to have been composed by Ganadhara Sudharmaswami as per the Śvetámbara tradition.

Subject matter of the Agama
It contains stories describing those who succeeded accumulating pious karmas and succeeded in attaining the highest heavens being reborn as devas on account of good deeds.

English translations
Popular English Translations are  :-
Illustrated SRI ANUTTARAUPAPATIKADASA SUTRA Prakrit Gatha - Hindi exposition - English exposition and Appendices Ed. by Pravartaka Amar Muni, Shrichand Surana Saras, Eng. tr. by Surendra Bothra

Jain texts